The province of Piraeus was one of the provinces of the Piraeus Prefecture. Its territory corresponded with that of the current municipalities Salamis and Spetses. It was abolished in 2006.

References

Provinces of Greece